Associazione Sportiva Dilettantistica Vallée d’Aoste Charvensod is an Italian association football club, based in Charvensod, Aosta Valley.

The club currently plays in Promozione Piedmont and Aosta Valley.

History

From Aosta Calcio Charvensod to Vallée d’Aoste Charvensod
U.S. Aosta Calcio Charvensod was founded in 2004 after the merger of A.S. Aosta 2000 and Charvensod Sant’Orso.

In 2007 it became A.S.D. Charvensod Aosta.

In the summer of 2010 the club, who had just been relegated to Prima Categoria, changes its name in A.S.D. Vallée d’Aoste Charvensod, in order to continue so the tradition of the former Valle d'Aosta Calcio which had been dissolved and ostensibly represented the Aosta Valley region, however, the club never formally acquired the sports title and assets.

The team was promoted from Prima Categoria Piedmont and Aosta to Promozione Piedmont and Aosta Valley in the 2010–11 season.

References

External links

Football clubs in Piedmont and Aosta Valley
Association football clubs established in 2004
2004 establishments in Italy